CCRI is a four-letter initialism which may stand for the following:

 California Civil Rights Initiative
 Children's Cancer Research Institute
 Clandestine Revolutionary Indigenous Committee (CCRI in Spanish)
 Commonwealth Computer Research, Inc.
 Community College of Rhode Island
 Correspondance Commerciale-Réponse Internationale, International Business Reply Service IBRS
 Cyprus Cancer Research Institute
 Czech Clinical Research Institute